It was a fort in the Roman province of Dacia, at modern Sărățeni, Mureș.

See also
List of castra

External links
Roman castra from Romania - Google Maps / Earth

Notes

Roman legionary fortresses in Romania
Ancient history of Transylvania
Historic monuments in Mureș County